Bush Hill may relate to 
 Bush Hill, a cold seep in the northern Gulf of Mexico (Green Canyon block 185) famous for its bushes of tube worms
Bush Hill, Gauteng, in South Africa
 Bush Hill, Enfield, a part of the London Borough of Enfield